Psychiatric hospitals, also known as mental health hospitals, behavioral health hospitals, are hospitals or wards specializing in the treatment of severe mental disorders, such as schizophrenia, bipolar disorder, eating disorders, dissociative identity disorder, major depressive disorder and many others. Psychiatric hospitals vary widely in their size and grading. Some hospitals may specialize only in short-term or outpatient therapy for low-risk patients. Others may specialize in the temporary or permanent containment of patients who need routine assistance, treatment, or a specialized and controlled environment due to a psychiatric disorder. Patients often choose voluntary commitment, but those whom psychiatrists believe to pose significant danger to themselves or others may be subject to involuntary commitment and involuntary treatment. Psychiatric hospitals may also be called psychiatric wards/units (or "psych" wards/units) when they are a subunit of a regular hospital.

The modern psychiatric hospital evolved from and eventually replaced the older lunatic asylum. The treatment of inmates in early lunatic asylums was sometimes brutal and focused on containment and restraint. With successive waves of reform, and the introduction of effective evidence-based treatments, most modern psychiatric hospitals emphasize treatment, and attempt where possible to help patients control their lives in the outside world, with the use of a combination of psychiatric medications and psychotherapy. Exceptions include Japan, where many psychiatric hospitals still use physical restraints on patients, tying them to their beds for days or even months at a time, and India, where the use of restraint and seclusion is endemic.

History

Modern psychiatric hospitals evolved from, and eventually replaced, the older lunatic asylum. Their development also entails the rise of organized institutional psychiatry.

Hospitals known as bimaristans were built in the Middle East beginning around the early 9th century, with the first in Baghdad under the leadership of the Abbasid Caliph Harun al-Rashid. While not devoted solely to patients with psychiatric disorders, they often contained wards for patients exhibiting mania or other psychological distress. Because of cultural taboos against refusing to care for one's family members, mentally ill patients would be surrendered to a bimaristan only if the patient demonstrated violence, incurable chronic illness, or some other extremely debilitating ailment. Psychological wards were typically enclosed by iron bars owing to the aggression of some of the patients.

In Western Europe physicians like Philippe Pinel at the Bicêtre Hospital in France and William Tuke at the York Retreat in England began to advocated for the viewing of mental illness as a disorder that required compassionate treatment that would aid in the rehabilitation of the victim. In the Western world, the arrival of institutionalisation as a solution to the problem of madness was very much an advent of the nineteenth century. The first public mental asylums were established in Britain; the passing of the County Asylums Act 1808 empowered magistrates to build rate-supported asylums in every county to house the many 'pauper lunatics'. Nine counties first applied, the first public asylum opening in 1812 in Nottinghamshire. In 1828, the newly appointed Commissioners in Lunacy were empowered to license and supervise private asylums. The Lunacy Act 1845 made the construction of asylums in every county compulsory with regular inspections on behalf of the Home Secretary, and required asylums to have written regulations and a resident physician.

At the beginning of the nineteenth century there were a few thousand people housed in a variety of disparate institutions throughout England, but by 1900 that figure had grown to about 100,000. This growth coincided with the growth of alienism, later known as psychiatry, as a medical specialism. The treatment of inmates in early lunatic asylums was sometimes very brutal and focused on containment and restraint.

In the late 19th and early 20th centuries, terms such as "madness", "lunacy" or "insanity"—all of which assumed a unitary psychosis—were split into numerous "mental diseases", of which catatonia, melancholia and dementia praecox (modern day schizophrenia) were the most common in psychiatric institutions.

In 1961 sociologist Erving Goffman described a theory of the "total institution" and the process by which it takes efforts to maintain predictable and regular behavior on the part of both "guard" and "captor", suggesting that many of the features of such institutions serve the ritual function of ensuring that both classes of people know their function and social role, in other words of "institutionalizing" them. Asylums was a key text in the development of deinstitutionalization.

With successive waves of reform and the introduction of effective evidence-based treatments, modern psychiatric hospitals provide a primary emphasis on treatment; and further, they attempt—where possible—to help patients control their own lives in the outside world with the use of a combination of psychiatric drugs and psychotherapy. These treatments can be involuntary. Involuntary treatments are among the many psychiatric practices which are questioned by the mental patient liberation movement. Most psychiatric hospitals now restrict internet access and any device that can take photos.  In the U.S. state of Connecticut, involuntary patients must be examined annually by a court-appointed psychiatrist. Patients may also apply for release at any time and receive a full hearing on the application.

Types

There are a number of different types of modern psychiatric hospitals, but all of them house people with mental illnesses of widely variable severity. In the United Kingdom, both crisis admissions and medium-term care are usually provided on acute admissions wards. Juvenile or youth wards in psychiatric hospitals or psychiatric wards are set aside for children or youth with mental illness. Long-term care facilities have the goal of treatment and rehabilitation within a short time-frame (two or three years). Another institution for the mentally ill is a community-based halfway house.

Crisis stabilization
Crisis Stabilization Units (CSU) are small facilities with minimal beds used for people in crisis whose needs cannot be met safely in residential service settings.

Open units
Open psychiatric units are not as secure as crisis stabilization units. They are not used for acutely suicidal persons; instead, the focus in these units is to make life as normal as possible for patients while continuing treatment to the point where they can be discharged. However, patients are usually still not allowed to hold their own medications in their rooms because of the risk of an impulsive overdose. While some open units are physically unlocked, other open units still use locked entrances and exits, depending on the type of patients admitted.

Medium term
Another type of psychiatric hospital is medium term, which provides care lasting several weeks. Most drugs used for psychiatric purposes take several weeks to take effect, and the main purpose of these hospitals is to monitor the patient for the first few weeks of therapy to ensure the treatment is effective.

Juvenile wards
Juvenile wards are sections of psychiatric hospitals or psychiatric wards set aside for children with mental illness. However, there are a number of institutions specializing only in the treatment of juveniles, particularly when dealing with drug abuse, self-harm, eating disorders, anxiety, depression or other mental illnesses.

Long-term care facilities

In the UK, long-term care facilities are now being replaced with smaller secure units (some within the hospitals listed above). Modern buildings, modern security, and being locally situated to help with reintegration into society once medication has stabilized the condition are often features of such units. Examples of this include the Three Bridges Unit, in the grounds of St Bernard's Hospital in West London and the John Munroe Hospital in Staffordshire. However, these modern units have the goal of treatment and rehabilitation to allow for transition back into society within a short time-frame (two or three years). However, not all  patients' treatment can meet this criterion, so the large hospitals mentioned above often retain this role.

These hospitals provide stabilization and rehabilitation for those who are actively experiencing uncontrolled symptoms of mental disorders such as depression, bipolar disorders, eating disorders, and so on.

Halfway houses
One type of institution for the mentally ill is a community-based halfway house. These facilities provide assisted living for an extended period of time for patients with mental illnesses, and they often aid in the transition to self-sufficiency. These institutions are considered to be one of the most important parts of a mental health system by many psychiatrists, although some localities lack sufficient funding.

Political imprisonment
In some countries, the mental institution may be used for the incarceration of political prisoners as a form of punishment. A notable historical example was the use of punitive psychiatry in the Soviet Union and China. In modern times, it is known that Belarus is using punitive psychiatry toward political opponents and critics of current government.

Secure units
In the UK, criminal courts or the Home Secretary can, under various sections of the Mental Health Act, order the detention of offenders in a psychiatric hospital, but the term "criminally insane" is no longer legally or medically recognized. Secure psychiatric units exist in all regions of the UK for this purpose; in addition, there are a few specialist hospitals which offer treatment with high levels of security. These facilities are divided into three main categories: High, Medium and Low Secure. Although the phrase "Maximum Secure" is often used in the media, there is no such classification. "Local Secure" is a common misnomer for Low Secure units, as patients are often detained there by local criminal courts for psychiatric assessment before sentencing.

Run by the National Health Service, these facilities which provide psychiatric assessments can also provide treatment and accommodation in a safe hospital environment which prevents absconding. Thus there is far less risk of patients harming themselves or others. The Central Mental Hospital in Dublin performs a similar function.

Community hospital utilization
Community hospitals across the United States regularly see mental health discharges. A study of community hospital discharge data from 2003 to 2011 showed that mental health hospitalizations were increasing for both children (patients aged 0–17 years) and adults (patients aged 18–64). Compared to other hospital utilization, mental health discharges for children were the lowest while the most rapidly increasing hospitalizations were for adults under 64. Some units have been opened to provide "Therapeutically Enhanced Treatment" and so form a subcategory to the three main unit types.

The general public in the UK are familiar with the names of the High Secure Hospitals due to the frequency that they are mentioned in the news reports about the people who are sent there. Those in the UK include Ashworth Hospital in Merseyside, Broadmoor Hospital in Crowthorne, Berkshire, Rampton Secure Hospital in Retford, Nottinghamshire, and Scotland's The State Hospital in Carstairs. Northern Ireland and the Isle of Man have their own Medium and Low Secure units but use the mainland facilities for High Secure, to which smaller Channel Islands also transfer their patients as Out of Area (Off-Island Placements) Referrals under the Mental Health Act 1983. Of the three unit types, Medium Secure is most prevalent throughout the UK. As of 2009, there were 27 women-only units in England alone. Irish units include those at prisons in Portlaise, Castelrea and Cork.

Criticism
Hungarian-born psychiatrist Thomas Szasz argued that psychiatric hospitals are like prisons unlike other kinds of hospitals, and that psychiatrists who coerce people (into treatment or involuntary commitment) function as judges and jailers, not physicians. Historian Michel Foucault is widely known for his comprehensive critique of the use and abuse of the mental hospital system in Madness and Civilization. He argued that Tuke and Pinel's asylum was a symbolic recreation of the condition of a child under a bourgeois family. It was a microcosm symbolizing the massive structures of bourgeois society and its values: relations of Family–Children (paternal authority), Fault–Punishment (immediate justice), Madness–Disorder (social and moral order).

Erving Goffman coined the term "Total Institution" for mental hospitals and similar places which took over and confined a person's whole life. Goffman placed psychiatric hospitals in the same category as concentration camps, prisons, military organizations, orphanages, and monasteries. In his book Asylums Goffman describes how the institutionalisation process socialises people into the role of a good patient, someone "dull, harmless and inconspicuous"; in turn, it reinforces notions of chronicity in severe mental illness. The Rosenhan experiment of 1973 demonstrated the difficulty of distinguishing sane patients from insane patients.

Franco Basaglia, a leading psychiatrist who inspired and planned the psychiatric reform in Italy, also defined the mental hospital as an oppressive, locked and total institution in which prison-like, punitive rules are applied, in order to gradually eliminate its own contents. Patients, doctors and nurses are all subjected (at different levels) to the same process of institutionalism. American psychiatrist Loren Mosher noticed that the psychiatric institution itself gave him master classes in the art of the "total institution": labeling, unnecessary dependency, the induction and perpetuation of powerlessness, the degradation ceremony, authoritarianism, and the primacy of institutional needs over the patients, whom it was ostensibly there to serve.

The anti-psychiatry movement coming to the fore in the 1960s has opposed many of the practices, conditions, or existence of mental hospitals; due to the extreme conditions in them. The psychiatric consumer/survivor movement has often objected to or campaigned against conditions in mental hospitals or their use, voluntarily or involuntarily. The mental patient liberation movement emphatically opposes involuntary treatment but it generally does not object to any psychiatric treatments that are consensual, provided that both parties can withdraw consent at any time.

Undercover journalism
Alongside the 1973 academic investigation by Rosenhan and other similar experiments, several journalists have been willingly admitted to hospitals in order to conduct undercover journalism.  These include:
 Julius Chambers, who visited Bloomingdale Insane Asylum in 1872, leading to the 1876 book A Mad World and Its People.
 Nelly Bly, who admitted herself to a mental institution in 1887, leading to the work Ten Days in a Mad-House.
 Frank Smith in 1935 admitted himself into a Kankakee hospital, leading to the articles Seven days in the Madhouse in the Chicago Daily Times.
 Michael Mok who investigated similarly in New York 1961, winning the Lasker prize.
 Frank Sutherland who received coaching from a psychiatrist in order to accurately feign symptoms, and spent 31 days in late 1973 to early 1974, leading to a series of articles in the Nashville Tennessean.
 Betty Wells who investigated in 1974, with the articles titled A Trip Into Darkness for the Wichita Eagle.

See also

 Deinstitutionalisation
 History of mental disorders
 History of psychiatric institutions
 Institutional syndrome
 Kirkbride Plan
 Mental health law
 MindFreedom International
 New Freedom Commission on Mental Health
 Psychiatric survivors movement
 Political abuse of psychiatry in the Soviet Union
 Salutogenesis, a best-practice methodology for the design of psychiatric facilities
 Treatment Advocacy Center, involuntary treatment proponent group

For lists of establishments, see the categorical index "Psychiatric hospitals" at the bottom of the page.

References

External links

 Camarillo State Mental Hospital History
 Historical Asylums website
 Asylum Projects – Asylum wiki database
 National Resource Center on Psychiatric Advance Directives
 Kirkbride Buildings History and photographs of early psychiatric hospitals
 TheTimeChamber Asylum List Comprehensive List of Victorian Insane Asylums in the UK
 Bipolar Disorder at WebMD
 Psychiatric hospitals rankings

 
Hospital departments
Penology
Total institutions